A lignotuber is a woody swelling of the root crown possessed by some plants as a protection against destruction of the plant stem, such as by fire. Other woody plants may develop basal burls as a similar survival strategy, often as a response to coppicing or other environmental stressors. However, lignotubers are specifically part of the normal course of development of the plants that possess them, and often develop early on in growth. The crown contains buds from which new stems may sprout, as well as stores of starch that can support a period of growth in the absence of photosynthesis. The term "lignotuber" was coined in 1924 by Australian botanist Leslie R. Kerr.

Plants possessing lignotubers on the western coast of the USA include California buckeye, coast redwood, California bay laurel (aka Oregon myrtle), and multiple species of manzanita and ceanothus.

At least 14 species in the Mediterranean region have been identified as having lignotubers (as of 1993). Lignotubers develop from the cotyledonary bud in seedlings of several oak species including cork oak Quercus suber, but do not develop in several other oak species, and are not apparent in mature cork oak trees.

The fire-resistant lignotubers of Erica arborea, known as "briar root", are commonly used to make smoking pipes.

The largest known lignotubers (also called "root collar burls") are those of the Coast Redwood (Sequoia sempervirens) of central and northern California and extreme southwestern Oregon. The largest dicot lignotubers are those of the Chinese Camphor Tree, or Kusu (Cinnamomum camphora) of Japan, China and the Koreas.

Many plants with lignotubers grow in a shrubby habit, but with multiple stems arising from the lignotuber. The term lignotuberous shrub is used to describe this habit.

See also
 California chaparral and woodlands
 Chaparral
 Crown sprouting
 Epicormic shoot, also fire-induced buds
 Fire ecology
 Geoxyle
 Resprouter

References

Plant morphology
Wildfire ecology